The Minister of Foreign Affairs and International Cooperation of the Republic of Sierra Leone is a cabinet minister in charge of the Ministry of Foreign Affairs and International Cooperation of Sierra Leone, responsible for conducting foreign relations of the country.

The following is a list of foreign ministers of Sierra Leone since its founding in 1961:

References

Foreign
Foreign Ministers